Hamam al-Alil (also: Hammam al-Alil; Arabic: حمام العليل "fresh bath") is a town south of Mosul about 27 KM in the Nineveh Governorate in Iraq, on the western bank of the Tigris River. It is referred to as the largest town south of the city. It is well-known with its mineral water springs that located on the side of the river and many people have been visited the town from all over Iraq to get the treatment of its water due to its various medical benefits of this water.

Recent history 

In 2014 the area seized by ISIL along with neighbouring Mosul. On 11 February 2014, 15 Iraqi soldiers were killed in a pre-dawn assault on an army camp guarding an oil pipeline near Hamam al-Alil. In July 2016, F16 fighters of the international coalition against ISIL had destroyed bases of the terrorist organisation in the area. During the 2016 Battle of Mosul the town was attacked by the Iraqi Army in the final days of October 2016 and reportedly "90 percent surrounded". Also it was reported that ISIL executed 42 civilians in the town.

A combination of Iraqi, federal police and elite interior ministry forces reportedly liberated the town from ISIL on 7 November 2016.

See also 

 Battle of Mosul (2016–17)

References 

Populated places in Nineveh Governorate